Franco van der Merwe (born 15 March 1983 in Paarl) is a South African rugby union footballer. His regular playing position is lock, although he can also operate as a flanker.  Previous clubs include Irish side Ulster in the Pro12, London Irish in Premiership Rugby, the Lions in Super Rugby and the Leopards and the Golden Lions in the Currie Cup.

Van der Merwe has been included in several Springbok squads since June 2012 and finally made his debut in the 2013 Rugby Championship match against .

He signed a two-year deal starting on 1 August 2014.

Van der Merwe was signed by Pro14 side Cardiff Blues for the 2017 season, however on August 1, 2017 he was released by the club due to club based “financial challenges”.

On 25 August 2017, he was named amongst the starting XV for a pre-season friendly game for London Irish against Richmond on a club trial. On 31 August it was announced he had been signed by the club. He was released ahead of the 2020–21 season.

References

External links

Lions profile
itsrugby.co.uk profile

Living people
1983 births
South African rugby union players
South Africa international rugby union players
Golden Lions players
Lions (United Rugby Championship) players
Sharks (rugby union) players
Leopards (rugby union) players
London Irish players
Sportspeople from Paarl
Rugby union locks
Rugby union flankers
North-West University alumni
Afrikaner people
Ulster Rugby players
South African expatriate rugby union players
South African expatriate sportspeople in Northern Ireland
Expatriate rugby union players in Northern Ireland
Rugby union players from the Western Cape
Expatriate rugby union players in England
South African expatriate sportspeople in England